Sugarloaf Mountain Park is a census-designated place (CDP) in Tulare County, California. The 2010 United States census reported Sugarloaf Mountain Park was uninhabited.

Geography
According to the United States Census Bureau, the CDP covers an area of 0.1 square miles (0.3 km), all of it land.

References

Census-designated places in Tulare County, California
Census-designated places in California